Tim Streather (born 14 June 1988) is a retired rugby union player who last played for Saracens in the Aviva Premiership.  His position is Centre, although he can also play as a Wing. He was Nottingham's player of the season for 2009. He was contracted with Nottingham until 2013. He won the RFU Championship Player of the Year award for the 2012–13 season. He joined Saracens in 2013. He retired in 2017.

References

External links
Nottingham RFC profile

1988 births
Living people
English rugby union players
Nottingham R.F.C. players
Rugby union players from Worcester
Rugby union centres
Rugby union wings
Saracens F.C. players